Eucalyptus staeri, commonly known as Albany blackbutt, is a species of small tree or a mallee and is endemic to the south-west corner of Western Australia. It has rough bark on the trunk and branches, thick, lance-shaped adult leaves, flowers buds in groups of between seven and fifteen, creamy white flowers and shortened spherical fruit.

Description
Flowering occurs from August or October to December or January or April and the flowers are creamy white.

Taxonomy and naming
Albany blackbutt was first formally described in 1914 by Joseph Maiden in the Journal and Proceedings of the Royal Society of New South Wales and given the name Eucalyptus marginata var. staeri. In 1924 Stephen Lackey Kessell and Charles Gardner raised the variety to species status as Eucalyptus staeri. The specific epithet (staeri) honours John Staer (1850-1933) who collected the type specimens.

Distribution and habitat
Eucalyptus staeri is found mostly in the south west corner of the Great Southern region of Western Australia centred around the town of  Albany with smaller populations extending north into the Wheatbelt. The preferred habitat is sandy soil in near-coastal scrubland.

Conservation status
This eucalypt is classified as "not threatened" by the Western Australian Government Department of Parks and Wildlife.

See also
List of Eucalyptus species

References 

staeri
Myrtales of Australia
Endemic flora of Southwest Australia
Eucalypts of Western Australia
Plants described in 1914
Taxa named by Joseph Maiden